Banjar Region (old spelling Bandjar) was an autonomous area formed in the southeastern part of Indonesian island of Borneo by the Netherlands in 1948 as part of an attempt to re-establish the colony of the Dutch East Indies during the Indonesian National Revolution.  Banjar became a constituent part of the United States of Indonesia in 1949.  The chairman of the Banjar Council was Mohammed Hanafiah.  The region was dissolved on 4 April 1950 and combined with Great Dayak and the Southeast Borneo Federation to form Kalimantan Province.  Today, the territory of the former region comprises around two thirds of South Kalimantan Province.

Person of interests
 M. Hanafiah
 Idham Chalid

References

Indonesian National Revolution
1948 establishments in the Dutch Empire